Teron is one of the five clans of the Karbi people in Northeast India and Bangladesh. Sometimes pronounce as Toron in Dumra area of Karbi inhabitance and sometimes as Tron in Ri-Bhoi area of Meghalaya. It is also known as Kronjang in verses, poetry or songs.

Sub-clan
It has nine sub-clans, namely:-
 Ai.
 Dengja.
 Kongkat.
 Langne.
 Meji.
 Milik.
 Sir-ang.
 Sir-ik.
 Torap.

Milik and kongkat predominantly found in Dumra and surroundings areas.

See also
Karbi people

References

Social groups of Assam
Clans
Karbi Anglong district